Geoffrey of Villehardouin (c. 1150 – c. 1213) was a French knight and historian who participated in and chronicled the Fourth Crusade.  He is considered one of the most important historians of the time period, best known for writing the eyewitness account De la Conquête de Constantinople (On the Conquest of Constantinople), about the battle for Constantinople between the Christians of the West and the Christians of the East on 13 April 1204.  The Conquest is the earliest French historical prose narrative that has survived to modern times. Ηis full title was: "Geoffroi of Villehardouin, Marshal of Champagne and of Romania".

Biography

A layman and a soldier, Geoffroi was appointed Marshal of Champagne from 1185 and  joined the Crusade in 1199 during a tournament held by Count Thibaud III of Champagne. Thibaud named him one of the ambassadors to Venice to procure ships for the voyage, and he helped to elect Boniface of Montferrat as the new leader of the Crusade when Thibaud died.

Although Geoffroi does not say so specifically in his own account, he probably supported the diversion of the Crusade first to Zara and then to Constantinople. While at Constantinople he also served as an ambassador to Isaac II Angelus, and was in the embassy that demanded that Isaac appoint Alexius IV co-emperor.

After the conquest of the Byzantine Empire in 1204 he served as a military leader, and led the retreat from the Battle of Adrianople in 1205 after Baldwin I was captured by the forces of the Second Bulgarian Empire. In recognition of his services, Boniface of Montferrat gave to Geoffroi the city of Messinopolis in Thrace. After the Crusade, he was named Marshal of the Latin Empire.

In 1207, Geoffroi began to write his chronicle of the Crusade, On the Conquest of Constantinople.  It was in French rather than Latin, making it one of the earliest works of French prose. Villehardouin's account is generally read alongside that of Robert of Clari, a French knight of low station, Niketas Choniates, a high-ranking Byzantine official and historian who gives an eyewitness account, and Gunther of Pairis, a Cistercian monk who tells the story from the perspective of Abbot Martin who accompanied the Crusaders.

Villehardouin's nephew Geoffroi I of Villehardouin went on to become Prince of Achaea in Morea (the medieval name for the Peloponnesus) in 1209. Villehardouin himself seems to have died shortly afterwards. His son Erard had taken the title of seigneur de Villehardouin in 1213. There is evidence of his children raising memorials for him in 1218, suggesting he died around this time.

See also
Chronicle of the Morea
Henry of Valenciennes

Notes

References
 This article focuses on a critical review of De la Conquête de Constantinople.
Chronicles of the Crusades (Villehardouin and Jean de Joinville), translated by Margaret R. B. Shaw (Penguin). 
Colin Morris, "Geoffroy de Villehardouin and the Conquest of Constantinople", History 53 (February 1968): 24-34
 
 Cristian Bratu, « Je, auteur de ce livre »: L’affirmation de soi chez les historiens, de l’Antiquité à la fin du Moyen Âge. Later Medieval Europe Series (vol. 20). Leiden: Brill, 2019.
 Cristian Bratu, “Je, aucteur de ce livre: Authorial Persona and Authority in French Medieval Histories and Chronicles.”  In Authorities in the Middle Ages. Influence, Legitimacy and Power in Medieval Society. Sini Kangas, Mia Korpiola, and Tuija Ainonen, eds. (Berlin/New York: De Gruyter, 2013): 183–204.
 Cristian Bratu, “Clerc, Chevalier, Aucteur: The Authorial Personae of French Medieval Historians from the 12th to the 15th centuries.” In Authority and Gender in Medieval and Renaissance Chronicles. Juliana Dresvina and Nicholas Sparks, eds. (Newcastle upon Tyne: Cambridge Scholars Publishing, 2012): 231–259.

External links
Villehardouin's chronicle, translated by T. Marzial (1908), at the Internet Medieval Sourcebook website
 
 

1150s births
1213 deaths
13th-century French historians
Villehardouin
French chroniclers
Villehardouin family
12th-century French people
Marshals of the Latin Empire
French male non-fiction writers
Christians of the Third Crusade
Christians of the Fourth Crusade
French memoirists